John Gregory Branca (born December 11, 1950, in Bronxville, New York), is an entertainment lawyer and manager who specializes in representing rock and roll acts. He is also co-executor of the Michael Jackson Estate.

Background

His mother, Barbara May Theresa Werle (October 6, 1928 - January 1, 2013) was an entertainer and Harvest Moon Ball winner who danced on The Ed Sullivan Show. Werle's acting credits include the Elvis Presley films Tickle Me, Harum Scarum (1965) and Charro! (1969); Battle of the Bulge (1965), The Rare Breed (1966), Gunfight in Abilene (1967) and Krakatoa, East of Java (1968), as well as recurring roles in the television series San Francisco International Airport (1970–1971) and The Virginian, during the 1960s and 1970s. She moved to Los Angeles when Branca was four to pursue her show business career. Branca lived with his father, also named John, who later served as the New York State Athletic Commissioner. (His uncle, Ralph Branca, pitched for the Brooklyn Dodgers for many years, including the 1947 World Series. He is portrayed in the Jackie Robinson biopic 42 as one of Robinson's earliest supporters.)

At age 11, Branca moved to LA, and at 13, started a rock band, The Other Half, for which he played guitar. Three years later, he played with a band that occasionally opened for The Doors at LA's Hullabaloo Club.

He majored in music at Los Angeles City College before transferring to Occidental College. Upon graduating, he enrolled at UCLA School of Law, serving as editor-in-chief of one of the law reviews, and received his degree in 1975.

While working as an estate planner at the firm of Kindel & Anderson, Branca came across a Time profile of Elton John which mentioned entertainment lawyers. Branca realized that this field of law was his true calling.

Career highlights

Michael Jackson

Branca was hired by Jackson after he fired his father Joseph Jackson as his manager of his career. He was also an instrumental in the production and release of Michael Jackson's Thriller short film..

Branca helped Jackson to purchase ATV Music Publishing in 1985 for $47,500,000 (which held the copyrights to The Beatles' and Little Richard's songs).  Within a few years the catalog was worth more than $400,000,000. Branca was also instrumental in facilitating the merger of ATV with Sony, creating one of the world's largest independent music publishers.

In the Michael Jackson probate case, Branca produced Jackson's final will and testament, which designated Branca as executor. The Jackson family filed a preemptive probate action in the Los Angeles Superior Court, based on the allegation that Jackson died "intestate," without a valid will. Branca filed the will in Los Angeles on July 1, 2009, and was appointed co-executor. After initially contesting the appointment of Branca and John McClain as executors of Michael's will, his mother Katherine withdrew her objections on November 10, 2009. According to the Associated Press, her attorney, Adam Streisand, said "Mrs. Jackson felt it was time legal fighting ended and that her actions were in the best interest of Michael's children." In an interview published in December 2010 she was quoted by the Los Angeles Times as saying that Branca and McClain are doing "a very good job" managing the estate.

Projects for the estate that Branca initiated include the concert film Michael Jackson's This Is It, which Branca served as Executive Producer; Cirque Du Soleil's "Immortal" which toured from 2011 to 2014 and closed as the eighth-highest-grossing tour of all time; a second, permanent "Cirque" show, Michael Jackson: One at Mandalay Bay in Las Vegas, which opened in June 2013 and of which he is also a producer; a bestselling Ubisoft video game; a Spike Lee documentary, Bad 25, which Branca also served as producer; the 2014 #1 hit album Xscape; and the "Slave to the Rhythm" "holographic" Jackson performance featured at the Billboard Music Awards, the first of its kind. Additionally, Branca and the estate brought in Tony Award winning Director/Choreographer Christopher Wheeldon and two-time Pulitzer Prize winner Lynn Nottage to create MJ the Musical, opening in February 2022, and an upcoming feature film about Jackson’s career produced by Bohemian Rhapsody (2018) producer Graham King that Branca hopes will become “the largest grossing, most acclaimed biopic in the history of Hollywood.”

In 2019, following the release of Leaving Neverland  which focuses on two men, Wade Robson and James Safechuck, who allege they were sexually abused as children by the singer, he and the rest of the estate condemned it as a "tabloid character assassination". The issues had caused them to file a $100 million lawsuit against HBO, petitioning the court to compel their arbitrate cooperation regarding the film's broadcast. As Jackson is dead, HBO cannot be sued for defamation. Instead, the estate claimed HBO had violated a 1992 agreement never to disparage Jackson's public image, stipulated in the terms for broadcasting his concert film Live in Bucharest: The Dangerous Tour. Eventually, he and the estate sued HBO for violating a non-disparagement clause in a 1992 contract by agreeing to run the documentary. The suit sought to compel HBO to litigate the issue in a public arbitration process and claimed that the estate could be awarded $100 million or more in damages. The suit accused HBO of fabricating lies with a financial motive. HBO did not stop the airing of the documentary on March 3. On September 19, Judge George Wu tentatively denied HBO's motion to dismiss the estate's lawsuit. Branca said HBO has been trying to suppress the other side of the story. "I've never seen a media organization fight so hard to keep a secret," Branca said. On the following day, Judge Wu gave a final ruling to deny HBO's motion to dismiss the case, granting the Jackson estate's motion to compel arbitration. On October 21, 2019, HBO filed a Notice of Appeal to the United States Court of Appeals for the Ninth Circuit seeking appellate review of the District Court's order, granting the Jackson estate's Motion to Compel Arbitration and shortly after applied for a stay of the arbitration proceedings. However, on November 7, he and the estate lost when HBO won its motion to keep the arbitration proceedings, leading Branca to postpone HBO's appeal to the Ninth Circuit.

Artist representation
In 1991, Branca put together what's considered rock's first mega-deal, a four-album deal for Aerosmith with Sony, estimated to be worth $50 million.

In 2005, Branca brokered a ground-breaking 360 deal between Korn and EMI, which made EMI a partner in all of Korn's operations. EMI earned a stake in all of Korn's touring and merchandise, instead of only handling the band's CDs, which has typically been the record company's role. A few months later, Branca, with his partner David Lande, expanded the circle to include concert promoter Live Nation. The duo has since put together Live Nation 360 deals for Shakira and Nickelback.

Music publishing
In 1985, Branca facilitated one of the most famous music publishing deals in history, the purchase of ATV Music Publishing for Michael Jackson.

In 2008, changes in the tax law that allowed songwriters to pay a small capital gains tax instead of a larger income tax prompted Branca to advise some of his clients that this was the perfect time to sell their music publishing catalogs, thereby establishing new precedents in valuation. Ensuing sales included: Kurt Cobain and Nirvana copyrights; Steve Tyler's Aerosmith publishing catalog of 160 songs to Primary Wave Music Publishing for $50 million; Julian Lennon's share of The Beatles' royalties, and the catalog of the legendary song-writing team of Leiber & Stoller to Sony/ATV, which created a new yardstick by which the worth of catalogs was measured. He also sold Berry Gordy's Jobete Music to EMI, which changed the method and standard by which catalogs were valued.

In 2009, Branca beat out Wall Street investment banking houses to represent the Rodgers & Hammerstein Organization and sold their catalog for an excess of $200 million, despite predictions by the Wall Street Journal and others that the catalog wouldn't fetch more than $150 million.

He also represented Sony Corporation of America in the $2.2 Billion acquisition of EMI Music Publishing and EMI and Sony/ATV in the sale of the Virgin Music catalog.

In addition, Branca helped songwriters such as Don Henley of The Eagles regain copyrights of their songs, or to help them secure royalties that they've lost, as he did with John Fogerty of Creedence Clearwater Revival.

Personal life

At Branca's first wedding, Michael Jackson was Best Man and Little Richard Penniman served as minister.

John is married to Jenna Hurt Branca. He has two sons from his second marriage, and a daughter from his first.

Public service
Branca helped Buddy Arnold form the Musicians Assistance Program, which later merged with MusiCares, which provides help to members of the music industry who need treatment for drug and alcohol addiction, as well as assistance for other financial, medical and personal crises. He currently serves as Chair Emeritus of Musicares. For his support, the Grammy Foundation honored him with its 2012 Service Award. Additionally, he is on the Board of the Grammy Museum, the Board of Trustees of Occidental College and on the Executive Committee of UCLA's Pauley Pavilion Renovation Campaign Committee, the goal of which is to transform the pavilion into a world-class sports and cultural facility for the university and community. Branca is a member of the Advisory Council for the Barack Obama Scholars Program at Occidental College.

Through his work on behalf of Jackson's Estate Branca has become outspoken advocate of protecting the deceased from defamation. At a June 2019, UCLA Law School panel titled “Truth Be Told? Documentary Films Today,” Branca stated: “The purpose of the First Amendment is supposedly getting at the truth, but the lack of defamation protection for an individual no longer living isn’t helpful in that regard. If copyright protection is life plus 75 years, there’s no reason a defamation suit shouldn’t be life plus 20, 30 or even 40 years.”

Branca is a Distinguished Alumni of Los Angeles City College. He also co-founded Club 42, an integrated youth baseball league honoring Jackie Robinson, a teammate and friend of Branca's uncle, Ralph, on the Brooklyn Dodgers, and Branca serves as a director of the Jackie Robinson Foundation.

In 2020, Branca was named to the Inaugural Board of Advisors for the Dean of the Herb Albert School of Music at UCLA.

References

External links

American entertainment lawyers
1950 births
Living people
UCLA School of Law alumni